Jim Germany (born February 2, 1953), is a former star running back in the Canadian Football League.

He played his college football at New Mexico State University, where he inducted into their Hall of Fame in 1994.  Drafted by the NFL's St. Louis Cardinals in 1975, in the 2nd round, 46th overall, he never played in the NFL and came to Canada.

His seven-year career with the Edmonton Eskimos, starting in 1977, saw him paired with Neil Lumsden and quarterbacks Warren Moon and Tom Wilkinson.  Together they formed the backfield backbone of the Eskimos' 5 Grey Cup championship dynasty.  Germany rushed for 1,000 yards 3 times, 1004 yards in 1977, 1324 yards in 1979, and 1019 yards in 1980, and he was an all star in 1981.  In 1981, he tied a CFL record with 18 rushing touchdowns.

In 2022 Germany was inducted into the Edmonton Elks Wall of Honour.

References

1953 births
Living people
Canadian football running backs
Edmonton Elks players
New Mexico State Aggies football players
Players of American football from Texas
People from New Waverly, Texas